Aleksandr Aravin (29 June 1958 – 4 August 2021) was a Russian actor, film director, and screenwriter. He mainly directed police films.

Biography
Aravin graduated from Bauman Moscow State Technical University in 1980 and retrained following the dissolution of the Soviet Union with the High Courses for Scriptwriters and Film Directors, studying under Alexander Kaidanovsky. He was a member of the Union of Cinematographers of the Russian Federation. His daughter, Aravina Anastasia, became a famous actress.

Filmography

Director
 (2002)
 (2004)
 (2005)
 (2018)

Screenwriter
 (2002)

References

1958 births
2021 deaths
Male actors from Moscow
Russian film actors
Russian film directors
Bauman Moscow State Technical University alumni
Mass media people from Moscow